Ibrahim Murtala Muhammed (born December 14, 1974) is Ghanaian politician and member of the Sixth Parliament of the Fourth Republic of Ghana. He once served as the member of Parliament for Nanton, the Deputy Minister for Information and Media Relations and the Deputy Minister of Trade and Industry.

Early years and education 
Muhammed attended Ghana Senior High (GHANASCO), Tamale. He  is a trained teacher who holds a teachers certificate A from Tamale College of Education (TACE) formerly Tamale training College (TATCO),Tamale. He also holds a master's degree in Development Planning and International Relations and Diplomacy from the Kwame Nkrumah University of Science and Technology and the University of Ghana respectively.

Political career 
In 2009 after the NDC won in 2008 elections ,Murtala Muhammed was appointed the deputy national coordinator of the National Youth Employment Programme (NYEP) by President John Evans Atta Mills which was later rebranded into Ghana Youth Employment Development Agency, (GYEDA). He held this position until he was elected Member of Parliament for the Nanton Constituency in the 2012 Elections.

Member of Parliament 
In 2006, following the decision of Professor Wayo Seini MP for Tamale Central constituency to cross the carpet to the NPP, a bye-elections was to be held to fill in as the constitution states. Ahead of the bye-elections Muhammed stood for the NDC primaries but lost to Inusah Fuseini who he lost again to in the 2008 NDC primaries. He later moved to stand for the primaries in the Nanton Constituency in the following elections.

2012 Parliamentary elections 
Muhammed served as member of parliament for the Nanton Constituency in the sixth Parliament of the Fourth Republic of Ghana. In December 2012, he won the parliamentary election to represent the Nanton constituency by getting 10,369 votes representing 52.66% of the total votes cast against his closest contender who was the incumbent member of parliament, Abdul-Kareem Iddrisu who got 8,667 votes representing 44.02%.

2016 Parliamentary elections 
In 2016,after serving one term in parliament, he lost his bid to be reelected as member of parliament to Mohammed Hardi Tuferu in the parliamentary elections. Tuferu garnered 11,346 votes representing 51.84% against Muhammed's 10,451 votes representing 47.75% of the votes cast. Ahead of the elections Muhammed was heard on radio stating that some other member of parliaments in the northern region were plotting to unseat him as member of parliament for Nanton.

2020 Parliamentary elections 
After the member of parliament for Tamale Central Inusah Fuseini decided not to run for the 2020 parliament elections the parliamentary seat become a vacant one for the National Democratic Congress going into the elections. As a result of that Murtala Muhammed declared his intentions to once again stand in the NDC primaries for the Tamale Central after unsuccessful primaries against Inusah Fuseini in 2006 and 2008. In August 2019, he won the primaries after getting 737 votes against his two contenders Alhassan Adam and Abdul Hanan Gundado who got 181 votes and 319 votes respectively.

Deputy Minister 
Muhammed served as both Deputy Minister for Information and Media Relations and subsequently Trade and Industry under the John Mahama government from between 2013–2017. In March 2013, he was appoint by President John Dramani Mahama to serve as deputy Minister to then Minister Mahama Ayariga, in the Ministry of Information and Media Relations. After serving in that capacity for one year, the President, realigned and merged the Ministry of Information and Media Relations and the Ministry of Communications because the two ministries were in a way regarded as duplicates. Due to the merger and reshuffle he was moved to serve as Deputy Minister of Tade and Industry along with Kweku Rickets-Hagan to new Trade and Industry Minister Ekwow Spio Garbrah. He served in this role until his party lost the 2016 elections and handed over government to the New Patriotic Party in January 2017.

Personal life 
He is a Muslim and married with three children.

References 

1974 births
Living people
Ghanaian Muslims
Place of birth missing (living people)
Ghanaian MPs 2013–2017
Kwame Nkrumah University of Science and Technology alumni
University of Ghana alumni
Ghanaian MPs 2021–2025
Ghana Senior High School (Tamale) alumni